The 2014 Latin American Series was the second edition of the Latin American Series, a baseball sporting event played by the champions of the professional winter leagues that make up the Latin American Professional Baseball Association (ALBP).

The competition took place at Estadio Dieciocho de Junio in Montería, Colombia from January 28 to February 1, 2014.

Participating teams

Group Phase 

|}

Playoff Phase 

Because second to fourth place in the group phase were tied, teams drew straws to determine second place and therefore the team who would qualify for Game 8.

Pre-playoff (Game 7)

Pre-playoff (Game 8)

Final

Statistics leaders

References

External links 
 Official Site

Latin American Series
2014 in baseball
International baseball competitions hosted by Colombia
Latin American Series
Latin American Series
Montería